Cuba competed at the 1964 Summer Olympics in Tokyo, Japan. 27 competitors, 25 men and 2 women, took part in 24 events in 6 sports.

Medalists

Athletics

Boxing

Fencing

Two fencers, one man and one woman, represented Cuba in 1964.

Men's foil
 Enrique Penabella

Men's sabre
 Enrique Penabella

Women's foil
 Mireya Rodríguez

Gymnastics

Rowing

Weightlifting

References

External links
Official Olympic Reports
International Olympic Committee results database

Nations at the 1964 Summer Olympics
1964
Olympics